Stefania woodleyi (Woodley's frog or Woodley's stefania) is a species of frog in the family Hemiphractidae. It is endemic to the eastern part of the Pakaraima Mountains in Guyana, including Mount Wokomung and Mount Ayanganna.

Description
Males measure  and females  in snout–vent length. The skin on the dorsum is shagreened to granular and medium brown in colour with irregular ochre spots or reticulations.

The female carries eggs on her back where the juveniles complete their development.

Habitat and conservation
Natural habitat of Stefania woodleyi is primary lowland forest at elevations of  asl. It is an uncommon species usually found near streams on rocks or branches. It can co-occur with Stefania evansi.

No threats to this species have been identified; it occurs in relatively isolated and undisturbed habitats. Its range includes Kaieteur National Park.

References

woodleyi
Amphibians of Guyana
Endemic fauna of Guyana
Taxonomy articles created by Polbot
Amphibians described in 1968